Utricularia costata is a small, probably annual carnivorous plant that belongs to the genus Utricularia. U. costata is endemic to Brazil and Venezuela. It grows as a terrestrial or lithophytic plant in damp soils among rocks in savannas. It was originally described and published by Peter Taylor in 1986.

See also 
 List of Utricularia species

References 

Carnivorous plants of South America
Flora of Brazil
Flora of Venezuela
costata
Plants described in 1986